Hyalopeza is a genus of tephritid  or fruit flies in the family Tephritidae.

Species
Hyalopeza aristae Hancock & Drew, 2003
Hyalopeza schneiderae Munro, 1957

References

Tephritinae
Tephritidae genera
Diptera of Australasia